The Asian Gymnastic Union (AGU) organizes Asian Gymnastics Championships for each of the FIG gymnastic disciplines: men's and women's artistic gymnastics, rhythmic gymnastics, acrobatic gymnastics, aerobic gymnastics and trampoline gymnastics. This article lists only the senior editions of the Asian Gymnastics Championships, in which competitors must be over 16 years of age. Specific editions of the Asian Championships also exist for junior athletes; for example, the first edition of the Junior Asian Artistic Gymnastics Championships was held in 1971, but the first senior edition of the tournament was only held in 1996. Similarly, Junior Asian Trampoline Championships were held in 2010 and 2012, but only in 2014 the Asian Gymnastics Union held a senior tournament  in conjunction with the junior championships for the first time.

Disciplines

Acrobatic

Aerobic

Artistic

Editions

All-time medal table

Best results by event and nation

Rhythmic

All-time medal table

Note Complete results of the 1996 edition are not currently available. 3 gold medals, 3 silver medals and 3 bronze medals distributed at the 1996 championships are unknown at the moment.

Trampoline

Asian Cup
Since 2018, the Asian Gymnastics Union organizes Asian Gymnastics Cups in gymnastics. Similar events have been organized in different continents, such as the Americas and Europe.

See also
 Aerobic gymnastics at the Asian Indoor and Martial Arts Games
 Gymnastics at the Asian Games

References

External links
Asian Gymnastic Union

 
Asian
Gymnastics
Recurring sporting events established in 1992